Come On Home is the thirteenth studio album by American musician Boz Scaggs released in 1997.

Reception

In their retrospective review, Allmusic called Come On Home "a genuine musical treasure."

Track listing
 "It All Went Down the Drain" (Earl King) - 5:32
 "Ask Me 'Bout Nothin' (But the Blues)" (Deadric Malone, Henry Boozier) - 4:39
 "Don't Cry No More" (Deadric Malone) - 3:12
 "Found Love" (Jimmy Reed) - 2:58
 "Come On Home" (Earl Randle, Willie Mitchell) - 3:14
 "Picture of a Broken Heart" (Scaggs, Dennis Walker) - 4:03
 "Love Letters" (Edward Heyman, Victor Young) - 3:47
 "I've Got Your Love" (Scaggs) - 4:34
 "Early in the Morning" (Sonny Boy Williamson I) - 4:38
 "Your Good Thing (Is About to End)" (David Porter, Isaac Hayes) - 7:21
 "T-Bone Shuffle" (T-Bone Walker) - 2:43
 "Sick and Tired" (Chris Kenner, Dave Bartholomew) - 4:31
 "After Hours" (Scaggs) - 4:04
 "Goodnight Louise" (Scaggs) - 4:02

Personnel

 Boz Scaggs – lead and backing vocals, guitar (1, 3, 4, 6–8, 11-13), horn arrangements (1, 3, 6, 12)
 Fred Tackett – guitar (1, 2, 5–8, 10–12)
 Steve Freund – guitar (4, 9)
 Charles Hodges – Hammond B3 organ (1, 3)
 Jim Cox – Hammond B3 organ (1, 5, 7), acoustic piano (5, 7, 8, 10, 14)
 Scott Plunkett – Hammond B3 organ (2, 7), acoustic piano (11)
 David Matthews – Hammond B3 organ (3, 7, 13), acoustic piano (12)
 Harry Duncan – harmonica (4, 9)
 Tom Coster – accordion (14)
 Freddie Washington – bass (1–3, 5, 7, 10, 12)
 James "Hutch" Hutchinson – bass (4, 6, 9, 11)
 Daryl Johnson – bass (8, 14)
 Jim Keltner – drums (1, 5, 7–10, 14)
 Ricky Fataar – drums (2–4, 11–13)
 Norbert Stachel – alto, baritone and tenor saxophones (1, 2, 6, 10–12, 14); horn arrangements (1, 2, 6, 10–12, 14)
 Vincent Lars – alto saxophone (1, 2, 6, 10–12, 14)
 Dave Ellis – tenor saxophone (1, 2, 6, 10–12, 14)
 Rev. Ron Stallings – tenor saxophone (1, 2, 6, 10–12, 14)
 Ronnie Cuber – baritone saxophone (2, 3, 10, 12), horn arrangements (2, 3, 10, 12)
 Lonnie McMillan – tenor saxophone (3)
 James Mitchell – baritone saxophone (3)
 Wayne Wallace – trombone (1, 2, 6, 10–12, 14)
 Marty Wehner – trombone (1, 2, 6, 10–12, 14)
 Jack Hale, Sr. – trombone (3)
 Brenda Rutledge – trombone (3)
 Bill Ortiz – trumpet (1, 2, 6, 10–12, 14)
 Ben Cauley – trumpet (3)
 Anthony Blea – violin (5)
 Otis Cooper – backing vocals (8)
 Kitty Beethoven – backing vocals (8)
 Conesha Monet Owens – backing vocals (8)

Production
 Producer – Boz Scaggs
 Executive Producer – Harry Duncan
 Recorded by Michael Rodriguez and Elliot Scheiner
 Assistant Engineers – Skip Curley and Bob Levy
 Recorded at Meac Studio, Skywalker Sound (Marin County, CA) and Royal Recording Studio (Memphis, TN).
 Mixed by Michael Rodriguez at Meac Studio
 Mastered by Bernie Grundman at Bernie Grundman Mastering (Hollywood, CA).
 Project Coordinators – Mark Scaggs (technical) and Mary Hogan (logistics).
 Art Direction and Design – Mick Haggerty
 Front Photography – Benedict J. Fernadez and Tom Keller
 Inlay Photography – Mick Haggerty
 Book Back Cover – Jean-Baptiste Mondino
 Management – Craig Fruin

References

External links
 Come On Home

Boz Scaggs albums
1997 albums
Virgin Records albums
Albums produced by Boz Scaggs